Wilson-Vines House, also known as the Roby Vines House, is a historic home located near Beaver Dam, Watauga County, North Carolina.  It was built about 1895, and is a -story, L-plan, Queen Anne style frame dwelling.  It rests on a stone foundation and is sheathed in clapboard and German siding.  The front facade features a two-story, two-piered, 3/4 width porch with decorative sawnwork.

It was listed on the National Register of Historic Places in 1997.

References

Houses on the National Register of Historic Places in North Carolina
Queen Anne architecture in North Carolina
Houses completed in 1917
Houses in Watauga County, North Carolina
National Register of Historic Places in Watauga County, North Carolina